Sediliopsis distans is an extinct species of sea snail, a marine gastropod mollusk in the family Pseudomelatomidae, the turrids and allies.

Description
The length of the shell attains 21.5 mm, its diameter 8 mm.

(Original description) The turriculate shell contains six whorls. These are scalariform, with distant obtuse ribs on the lower half. The suture is waved, with an impressed line above it. The body whorl shows an impressed revolving line above and four 
raised revolving lines inferiorly. The upper sinus of the outer lip is deep and rounded, the lower obsolete.

Distribution
Fossils of this species were found in Virginia, USA

References

 E. J. Petuch. 1988. Neogene History of Tropical American Mollusks 1-217

External links
 Don I. Tippett, Taxonomic notes on the western Atlantic Turridae (Gastropoda: Conoidea); the Nautilus v. 109 (1995-1996)
 Fossilworks: Sediliopsis distans

distans
Gastropods described in 1862